Khoroshovka is a rural locality (a village) in Beketovsky Selsoviet, Yermekeyevsky District, Bashkortostan, Russia. The population was 5 as of 2010. There is 1 street.

Geography 
Khoroshovka is located 35 km southeast of Yermekeyevo (the district's administrative centre) by road. Novoturayevo is the nearest rural locality.

References 

Rural localities in Yermekeyevsky District